Cecil Howard ( 1931 – December 16, 2016) was an adult film director whose aliases have included Howard Winters, Ward Summers, and Umberto Corleone.

Prior to beginning his career in pornography, he worked as an art director at book publishing company Lancer Books for several years. He began his career in pornography as a photographer and investor for softcore films made by his childhood friend Armand Weston, then went on to produce for established hardcore directors such as Henri Pachard and Chuck Vincent, before finally going on to direct many of his own films.

He died on December 16, 2016, at the age of 85.

Awards
 1984 AVN Award – Best Director, Film (Scoundrels)
 1987 AVN Award – Best Director, Film (Star Angel)
 XRCO Hall of Fame
 AVN Hall of Fame

References

External links
 
 
 IAFD Directing credits
 

Alt porn
Year of birth missing
2016 deaths
American photographers
American erotic photographers
American pornographic film directors
American pornographic film producers
1930s births